Zeina Ibrahim Sharaf (born 20 June 2003) is an Egyptian artistic gymnast. She was a member of the team who won gold at the 2019 African Games. Additionally, she represented Egypt at the 2018 Youth Olympic Games and the 2020 Olympic Games.

Personal life 
Ibrahim was born in Alexandria in 2003. She speaks both Arabic and English.

Gymnastics career

Junior

2016–17
Ibrahim made her international debut at the African Championships, where she helped Egypt place first in the team competition.  She next competed at the Tournoi International where she placed 24th in the all-around.  In 2017 Ibrahim only competed at the Egyptian Championships where she placed fifth in the junior division.

2018
Ibrahim started the season competing at the Stella Zakharova Cup in the Ukraine, where she finished ninth in the all-around but won bronze on the vault and gold on the balance beam.  She next competed at the African Championships where she helped Egypt place first as a team. Additionally, she placed third in the all-around and on uneven bars.  In September she competed at the Junior Mediterranean Championships where Egypt placed fourth as a team and individually Ibrahim placed 15th in the all-around and sixth on uneven bars.  In October Ibrahim represented Egypt at the 2018 Youth Olympic Games in Buenos Aires.  While there, she was assigned to the mixed multi-discipline team named after British gymnast Max Whitlock; they won the silver medal behind the team named after American gymnast Simone Biles. Individually, Ibrahim qualified to the all-around final; she finished in 18th place during the final.

Senior

2019
Ibrahim turned senior in 2019 and made her senior debut at the African Games. She, along with teammates Farah Hussein, Farah Salem, Mandy Mohamed, and Nancy Taman, won gold in the team competition.  Individually Ibrahim won the silver medal on the uneven bars behind compatriot Hussein.

2021
In May Ibrahim competed at the 2021 African Gymnastics Championships in which she placed first in the all-around and qualified to compete at the 2020 Olympic Games.  Ibrahim next competed at the Cairo World Challenge Cup where she won the bronze medal on balance beam behind Larisa Iordache and Diana Varinska and she finished sixth on the uneven bars.

At the Olympic Games, Ibrahim finished 64th in the all-around during qualifications and did not advance to any event finals.

2022
Ibrahim competed at the Cairo World Cup, where she finished seventh on the balance beam. She next competed at the Mediterranean Games alongside Jana Abdelsalam, Jana Aboelhasan, Jana Mahmoud, and Nour Swidan.  They finished sixth as a team. In July, Ibrahim competed at the African Championships, where she helped Egypt finish first as a team. As a result, they qualified a team to compete at the upcoming World Championships. Individually Ibrahim won gold on the balance beam and silver on the uneven bars behind Caitlin Rooskrantz of South Africa.

Competitive history

References

External links
 

2003 births
Living people
Egyptian female artistic gymnasts
Sportspeople from Alexandria
Gymnasts at the 2018 Summer Youth Olympics
African Games medalists in gymnastics
African Games gold medalists for Egypt
Gymnasts at the 2020 Summer Olympics
Olympic gymnasts of Egypt
Gymnasts at the 2022 Mediterranean Games
Competitors at the 2019 African Games
21st-century Egyptian women